Sarah or Sara Cohen may refer to:

 Sarah Blacher Cohen (1936–2008), writer, scholar, and playwright
 Sarah Cohen (journalist), American journalist
 Sarah Jacob Cohen, member of Kochi's Jewish community
 Sara Cohen (musicologist), musicologist and academic

See also 
 Sara Cohen School, Dunedin, New Zealand